John Jerome O’Connor (born 1972) is an American artist primarily known for his large-scale, labor-intensive, abstract works on paper. In these works, O'Connor transforms information through idiosyncratic processes, creating equally idiosyncratic abstract shapes, forms, and patterns. His works draw on relationships between spoken and written language, psychological fallacies, self-experimentation, mathematics, emergence in science and anthropology, and climate prediction and error.

O'Connor's works map transformations from one known state into another – those that occur quickly and ferociously, as in a political revolution where a system of beliefs can be upended in an instant, or when an earthquake tears the ground apart in a flash. He's equally interested in how substantive change occurs incrementally, almost imperceptibly. In these phase changes, the exact moment of transformation is virtually imperceptible (the moment when rain becomes ice, or when we turn from a believer into an agnostic). 

O'Connor explores these phenomena as they exist in diverse aspects of human life - natural, mathematical, social, psychological, and political. His work attempts to visually fix the specific, imperceptible moments of a transformation, from the mundane to the monumental.

Early work 
Influenced by the art and music of John Cage while studying at Pratt Institute, O'Connor created abstractions based on chance operations. In 1998 he made a series of small drawings by dipping jazz brushes in ink before playing them directly on paper. Each drawing represented a specific beat per minute played for a specific duration. In the late 1990s, O'Connor begin to explore systematic approaches to art making through drawing. These works were diagrammatic and process based. Though the compositions were simpler in these and other experimental works made in this period, O'Connor was laying the basic groundwork for his future methods and defining his unique conceptual framework, which he expanded at the Skowhegan School of Painting and Sculpture in 2000.

Recent work 

O'Connor's central works are large-scale drawings on paper made with colored pencil, and graphite. He also makes sculpture, photography, collage, and digital art. O'Connor is a member of the artist collective NonCoreProjector. Their project "Verbolect" is a multi-media work that explores the relationship between AI and human language, emotion, endurance, and computer-based introspection.

Drawings 
O'Connor's drawings are large-scale, detailed, meticulous pieces on paper that bridge text and language with abstraction and pattern. With their integration of information and language with shapes, forms, logos, pop imagery, and patterns, O'Connor's works link the process of looking with that of reading, decoding, and interpreting.

O'Connor's large-scale drawings often contain abstract forms made from multi-colored fields of text and patterns which are partly derived from combining simple logical processes (such as alphabet codes) and partly from intuitive reactions, described as his "trademark hallucinatory style". These processes often reveal unlikely connections between seemingly disparate data often with humorous or absurdist results. Information used in O'Connor's work include conversations the artist has had with Cleverbot, charts on male pattern baldness, chess game patterns, sunspot fluctuations, temperature prediction error, the prophesies of Nostradamus, census reports, storytelling as transmutation, memory fallacies, paradox of the heap, the Linda Problem, key smash patterns, escalation of violence, conspiracy theories, Hollywood filmmaking narratives, consumer drug effects, social class cycles, theories of time perception, rhyming mutations / Mondegreens, etc..

Patterns that emerge from linking these disparate data are often a structural conduit for his unique logic and subsequent aesthetic. He fuses the information that he's investigating within the patterns and forms he draws as a means of collapsing the space between the generation of a thought, its gradual manifestation, and final conclusion.

Butterflies 

O'Connor's recent series of 26 interconnected drawings are large, pictogram-like works that depict, through text and graphic images, the lifespan of a working class male as he encountered myriad obstacles, both real and imagined. These works reference Hollywood filmmaking, consumer drug effects, video game spaces, social class, popular music, dream imagery, theories of time perception, literary fiction, advertisement logos, etc. In a recent series of photographic collages, O'Connor fused close up NASA images of sunspots onto the surface of his face, creating, disturbing composite portraits that investigated the relationship between celestial patterns and those of the human being on Earth. Overall, many of O'Connor's recent works explore the moment when an individual's internal intentions and desires are affected, opposed, or concretely influenced by a more powerful external force.

Small Works 
O'Connor also make faster, smaller scaled collages, sculptures, and self-portraits. The time discrepancy in this aspect of his studio practice is intentional and undergirds his exploration of the intersection points between the political, scientific, mathematical, linguistic, and personal.

References

External links 

Jeffrey Gibson's review in Artforum - https://www.artforum.com/print/reviews/201701/john-o-connor-65451
Smithsonian Archives of American Art - https://www.aaa.si.edu/blog/2015/01/artists-on-diaries-sunspot-diary
Review Written by Charles Shultz Brooklyn Rail
Whitney Museum Collection - http://collection.whitney.org/object/33716
 Museum of Modern Art Collection - https://www.moma.org/collection/works/96839?locale=en

1972 births
Living people
American abstract artists
20th-century American painters
Skowhegan School of Painting and Sculpture alumni
21st-century American painters